Ciliopagurus liui is a species of hermit crab native to the Gulf of Tonkin and waters to the south of Japan.

References

Hermit crabs
Crustaceans described in 1995